Olga Kovalchuk is a Ukrainian Paralympic sport shooter. She represented Ukraine at the 2012 Summer Paralympics and at the 2016 Summer Paralympics and she won the silver medal in the women's 10 metre air pistol SH1 event in 2016.

References

External links 
 

Living people
Year of birth missing (living people)
Place of birth missing (living people)
Ukrainian female sport shooters
Shooters at the 2012 Summer Paralympics
Shooters at the 2016 Summer Paralympics
Medalists at the 2016 Summer Paralympics
Paralympic silver medalists for Ukraine
Paralympic medalists in shooting
Paralympic shooters of Ukraine
21st-century Ukrainian women